Joseph Unger (born May 25, 1949) is an American actor who has starred in many films and on television. He is best known for his role in Wes Craven's 1984 horror hit film A Nightmare on Elm Street as Sgt. Garcia, and as one of Leatherface's brothers, the hook handed Tinker, who appears in Leatherface: The Texas Chainsaw Massacre III (1990).

Unger was born and raised in Lake County, Tennessee in the United States of America.

His first feature movie was in the 1978 movie Go Tell the Spartans. His other films include Escape from New York (1981), Mask (1985), Barfly (1987), Road House (1989), he did a voice in the 1990 hit science fiction Total Recall.

Unger has made many guest appearances on TV shows, some of those appearances range from The A-Team, Alice, Airwolf, Cagney & Lacey, The Pretender, and Carnivàle.

Unger provided the voice of "Joe the Vampire Hunter" on the Adult Swim series Mary Shelley's Frankenhole.

Filmography
 1978 Go Tell the Spartans as Lieutenant Raymound Hamilton
 1979 Fast Charlie... The Moonbeam Rider as The Bank Teller
 1981 Escape from New York as Bill Taylor (scenes deleted)
 1984 National Lampoon's Joy of Sex as Mr. Ranada
 1984 A Nightmare on Elm Street as Sergeant Garcia
 1985 Mask as 1st Boyfriend
 1985 UFOria as Gas Station Attendant
 1986 The Deliberate Stranger (Direct-to-Television Film) as Unknown
 1986 Stagecoach (Direct-to-Television Film) as Captain Sickels
 1987 Barfly as Ben
 1987 Carly's Web (Direct-to-Television Film) as Unknown
 1988 Lucky Stiff as Kirby
 1989 Checking Out as Joe
 1989 Road House as Karpis
 1990 Leatherface: The Texas Chainsaw Massacre III as Tinker "Tink" Sawyer
 1990 Total Recall as Additional Voices (voice)
 1992 The Bodyguard as Journalist
 1992 Love Field as The Announcer
 1994 Pumpkinhead II: Blood Wings (Direct-to-Video Film) as Ernst
 1995 Night of the Scarecrow as Deputy #2
 1997 Drive as Waterfront Bartender
 1997 The Bad Pack as Fight Promoter
 1997 American Hero as Kipper
 1998 Spoiler as Clemets
 1998 Together & Alone as Roscoe
 1999 Natural Selection as Detective Harry Richards
 1999 Black and White as Charlie Sanders
 2000 South of Heaven, West of Hell as Nogales Sanches
 2000 Stranger than Fiction as Bubba
 2004 Death and Texas as Prison Guard
 2005 The Circle as The Motel Owner
 2006 The Visitation as Matt Kiley
 2006 Altered as Mr. Towne
 2007 Cold Ones as Hud
 2007 Broke Sky as Earl
 2007 Moving McAllister as Lanky
 2008 South of Heaven as "Rooster"
 2009 Sutures as Sheriff Baxter
 2010 Closed for the Season as The Carny
 2014 In Your Eyes as Wayne

External links
 

1949 births
Living people
People from Lake County, Tennessee
Male actors from Tennessee
American male film actors
American male television actors